Union Hill may refer to:

Communities
Union Hill, Alabama
Union Hill, California
Union Hill, Illinois
Union Hill, Kansas City, Missouri - a redeveloping neighborhood 
Union Hill, Minnesota
Union Hill, Hudson County, New Jersey, a former town that is now part of Union City
Union Hill, Morris County, New Jersey
Union Hill, New York- a hamlet in Monroe County, New York
Union Hill, Surry County, North Carolina
Union Hill, Henderson County, Texas
Union Hill, Buckingham County, Virginia
Union Hill, Richmond, Virginia
Union Hill-Novelty Hill, Washington

Schools
Union Hill High School, Union City, New Jersey
Union Hill School District, Grass Valley, California
Union Hill Independent School District, Upshur County, Texas